Robert Blake (27 September 1598 – 17 August 1657) was an English naval officer who served as the Lord Warden of the Cinque Ports from 1656 to 1657. Blake is recognised as the chief founder of England's naval supremacy, a dominance subsequently inherited by the British Royal Navy well into the early 20th century. Despite this, due to deliberate attempts to expunge the Parliamentarians from historical records following the Stuart Restoration, Blake's achievements tend to remain unrecognized. Blake's successes have been considered to have "never been excelled, not even by Nelson" according to one biographer.

Early life

The Blake family had a seat for several generations at (and were Lords of the Manor of) Tuxwell, in the parish of Bishops Lydeard, near Bridgwater, Somerset. The earliest member of the family located in records was Humphrey Blake, who lived in the reign of Henry VIII. Robert Blake's grandfather, also named Robert, was the first of the family to strike out on his own from country life as a merchant, hoping to become rich from Spanish trade. He served as chief magistrate and member of Parliament for Bridgwater several times, in recognition of the esteem in which the townspeople held him. His son, Humphrey, succeeded him in business, and in addition to his father's estates at Puriton (of which he held the lordship), Catcot, Bawdrip, and Woolavington, came into the estate at Plainsfield held by the family of his wife, Sara Williams, since the reign of Henry VII.

Robert Blake was the first son of thirteen children born to Humphrey and Sara. He attended Bridgwater Grammar School for Boys, then went up to Wadham College, Oxford. He had hoped to follow an academic career, but failed to secure a fellowship to Merton College, probably in consideration of his political and religious views, but also because the warden of Merton, Sir Henry Savile, had 'an eccentric distaste for men of low stature'. Blake, at five feet, six inches tall, thus failed to meet Savile's 'standard of manly beauty'.

After his departure from university in 1625, it is believed that Blake was engaged in trade, and a Dutch writer subsequently claimed that he had lived for 'five or six years' in Schiedam. Having returned to Bridgwater, probably because of the death of his mother in 1638, he decided to stand for election to Parliament.

In politics
In 1640 Blake was elected as the Member of Parliament for Bridgwater in the Short Parliament. When the English Civil War broke out during the period of the Long Parliament, and having failed to be re-elected, Blake began his military career on the side of the parliamentarians despite having no substantial experience of military or naval matters.

He would later return to recover from an injury sustained in the Battle of Portland. During that time he represented Bridgwater in the Barebone's Parliament of 1653 and First Protectorate Parliament of 1654 and Taunton in the Second Protectorate Parliament of 1656 before returning to sea.

On land
After joining the New Model Army as a captain in Alexander Popham's regiment, Blake distinguished himself at the Siege of Bristol (July 1643) and was promoted to lieutenant colonel. After his leading role in holding Lyme Regis in the Siege of Lyme Regis (April 1644) he was promoted to colonel. He went on to hold the Parliamentary enclave of Taunton during the Siege of Taunton (1645), which earned him national recognition and where he famously declared that he would eat three of his four pairs of boots before he would surrender. He subsequently succeeded in winning the Siege of Dunster (November 1645).

At sea
Blake was appointed general at sea in 1649. Although it is commonly used, Blake's name was never prefixed by 'admiral', a rank which was not used in the Parliamentarian navy; his actual rank of general at sea combined the role of an admiral and commissioner of the Navy. In 1651 he led a force to successfully remove the Royalist Sir John Grenville from the Scilly Isles, where he had been appointed Governor by Charles II after a local rebellion.

Blake is often referred to as the 'Father of the Royal Navy'. As well as being largely responsible for building the largest navy the country had ever known, from a few tens of ships to well over a hundred, he was first to keep a fleet at sea over the winter. Blake also produced the navy's first ever set of rules and regulations, The Laws of War and Ordinances of the Sea, the first version of which, containing 20 provisions, was passed by the House of Commons on 5 March 1649, with a printed version published in 1652 as The Laws of War and Ordinances of the Sea (Ordained and Established by the Parliament of the Commonwealth of England), listing 39 offences and their punishments – mostly death. The Instructions of the Admirals and Generals of the Fleet for Councils of War, issued in 1653 by Blake, George Monck, John Disbrowe, and William Penn, also instituted the first naval courts-martial in the English navy.

Blake developed new techniques to conduct blockades and landings; his Sailing Instructions and Fighting Instructions, which were major overhauls of naval tactics written while recovering from injury in 1653, were the foundation of English naval tactics in the Age of Sail. Blake's Fighting Instructions, issued by the generals at sea on 29 March 1653, are the first known instructions to be written in any language to adopt the use of the single line ahead battle formation. Blake was also the first to repeatedly successfully attack despite fire from shore forts.

In 1656, the year before his death, Blake was appointed Lord Warden of the Cinque Ports.

English Civil War

On 11 January 1649 Prince Rupert of the Rhine led eight undermanned ships to Kinsale in Ireland in an attempt to prevent the Parliamentarians taking Ireland from the Royalists. Blake blockaded Rupert's fleet in Kinsale from 22 May, allowing Oliver Cromwell to land at Dublin on 15 August. Blake was driven off by a storm in October and Rupert escaped via Spain to Lisbon, where he had expanded his fleet to 13 ships. Blake put to sea with 12 ships in February 1650 and dropped anchor off Lisbon in an attempt to persuade the Portuguese king to expel Rupert. After two months the king decided to back Rupert. Blake was joined by another four warships commanded by Edward Popham, who brought authority to go to war with Portugal.

Rupert twice failed to break the blockade, which was finally raised after Blake sailed for Cádiz with seven ships he had captured after a three-hour engagement with 23 ships of the Portuguese fleet (during which the Portuguese vice-admiral was also sunk.) Blake re-engaged with Rupert, now with six ships, on 3 November near Málaga, capturing one ship. Two days later Rupert's other ships in the area were driven ashore attempting to escape from Cartagena, securing Parliamentarian supremacy at sea, and the recognition of the Parliamentary government by many European states. Parliament voted Blake 1,000 pounds by way of thanks in February 1651. In June of the same year Blake captured the Isles of Scilly, the last outpost of the Royalist navy, for which he again received Parliament's thanks. Soon afterwards he was made a member of the Council of State.

Thanks to its command of the sea, the fleet was able to supply Cromwell's army with provisions as it successfully marched on Scotland. By the end of 1652 the various English colonies in the Americas had also been secured.

First Anglo-Dutch War

Blake's next adventures were during the First Anglo-Dutch War. The war started prematurely with a skirmish between the Dutch fleet of Maarten Tromp and Blake off Folkestone on 29 May 1652, the Battle of Dover. The proper war started in June with an English campaign against the Dutch East Indies, Baltic and fishing trades by Blake, in command of around 60 ships. On 5 October 1652 Dutch Vice-Admiral Witte Corneliszoon de With, underestimating the strength of the English, attempted to attack Blake, but due to the weather it was Blake who attacked on 8 October 1652 in the Battle of the Kentish Knock, sending de With back to the Netherlands in defeat. The English government seemed to think that the war was over and sent ships away to the Mediterranean. Blake had only 42 warships when he was attacked and decisively defeated by 88 Dutch ships under Tromp on 9 December 1652 in the Battle of Dungeness, losing control of the English Channel to the Dutch. Meanwhile, the ships sent away had also been defeated in the Battle of Leghorn.

Following the navy's poor performance at Dungeness, Blake demanded that the Lords Commissioners of the Admiralty enact major reforms. They complied by, among other things, enacting Articles of War to reinforce the authority of an admiral over his captains. Blake then sailed with around 75 ships to disrupt Channel shipping, engaging Tromp with a similar sized fleet in the Battle of Portland from 28 February to 2 March 1653 when Tromp escaped with his convoy under cover of darkness.

At the Battle of the Gabbard on 12 and 13 June 1653 Blake reinforced the ships of Generals Richard Deane and George Monck and decisively defeated the Dutch fleet, sinking or capturing 17 ships without losing one. Now also the North Sea was brought under English control, and the Dutch fleet was blockaded in various ports until the Battle of Scheveningen, where Tromp was killed.

Peace with the Dutch achieved, Blake sailed in October 1654 with 24 warships as commander-in-chief of the Mediterranean Fleet, successfully deterring the Duke of Guise from conquering Naples.

Bey of Tunis

In April 1655 Blake was sent to the Mediterranean again to extract compensation from the piratical states that had been attacking English shipping. The Dey of Tunis refused compensation, and with 15 ships Blake destroyed the two shore batteries and nine Algerian ships in Porto Farina, the first time shore batteries had been taken out without landing men ashore.

Anglo-Spanish War

In February 1656 commercial rivalry with Spain was soon turned to war. In the Anglo-Spanish War Blake blockaded Cádiz, during which one of his captains, Richard Stayner, destroyed most of the Spanish plate fleet at the Battle of Cádiz. A galleon of treasure was captured, and the overall loss to Spain was estimated at £2,000,000. Blake maintained the blockade throughout the winter, the first time the fleet had stayed at sea over winter.

On 20 April 1657 Blake totally destroyed another armed merchant convoy, the Spanish West Indian fleet, in the Battle of Santa Cruz de Tenerife – a port so well fortified that it was thought to be impregnable to attack from the sea – for the loss of just one ship. Although the silver had already been landed, Blake's victory delayed its arrival at the royal treasury of the Spanish government and earned the new English Navy respect throughout Europe. As a reward Blake was given an expensive diamond ring by Cromwell. The action also earned him respect 140 years later from Lord Nelson who lost his arm there in a failed attack; in a letter written on 17 April 1797, to Admiral Sir John Jervis, Nelson wrote "I do not reckon myself equal to Blake", before going on to outline the plans for his own attack. Lord Nelson ranked Robert Blake as one of the greatest naval generals ever known, even when compared with his own reputation.

Death

After again cruising off Cadiz for a while, Blake turned for home but died of old wounds within sight of Plymouth. After lying in state in the Queen's House, Greenwich, he was given a full state funeral and was buried in Westminster Abbey in the presence of Oliver Cromwell and the members of the Council of State (although his internal organs had earlier been buried at St Andrew's Church, Plymouth). After the restoration of the Monarchy his body was exhumed in 1661 and dumped in a common grave in St Margaret's churchyard, adjoining the Abbey, on the orders of the new king, Charles II.

Honouring Blake

In Westminster Abbey, a stone memorial of Robert Blake, unveiled on 27 February 1945, can be found in the south choir aisle.

St Margaret's Church, where Blake was reburied, has a stained glass window depicting Blake's life, together with a brass plaque to his memory, unveiled on 18 December 1888. A modern stone memorial to Blake and the other Parliamentarians reburied in the churchyard has been set into the external wall to the left of the main entrance of the church.

In 1926 the house in Bridgwater, where it is believed that Blake was born, was purchased and turned into the Blake Museum, where a room is devoted to him and his exploits.

Blake is one of four maritime figures depicted with a statue on the facade of Deptford Town Hall, in the London Borough of Lewisham.

Blake and his flagship Triumph featured on a second class postage stamp issued in 1982.

In 2007 various events took place in Bridgwater, Somerset, from April to September to commemorate the 350th anniversary of the death of Robert Blake. These included a civic ceremony on 8 July 2007 and a 17th-century market on 15 July 2007.

In the Royal Navy a series of ships have carried the name HMS Blake in honour of the general at sea. The bell of the last HMS Blake, scrapped in 1982, was on display in Saint Mary's Church, Bridgwater. This was moved to the Blake Museum in 2017 when the church was re-ordered.

The Blake Oilfield in the United Kingdom Sector of the North Sea is named in honour of the general at sea.

Blake is also mentioned in the poem Ye Mariners of England by Thomas Campbell, and is the subject of the poetical illustration  by Letitia Elizabeth Landon to an engraving by John Cochran after Briggs in Fisher's Drawing Room Scrap Book, 1837.

Blake also has a school house named after him at The Royal Hospital School, and a Division at Britannia Royal Naval College.

Relatives
Blake's brother, Benjamin Blake (1614–1689), served under Robert, emigrated to Carolina in 1682, and was the father of Joseph Blake, governor of South Carolina in 1694 and from 1696 to 1700.

Blake's brother Samual Blake fought under Popham before being killed in a duel in 1645.

A collateral relative was the historian Robert Blake, Baron Blake (1916–2003).

See also
 British ensign
 British military history
 List of English people

References

Further reading
 Dixon, William Hepworth. Robert Blake: Admiral and General at Sea: Based on Family and State Papers. Mount Kisco, N.Y.: Regatta Press, 2000.   ; This volume was originally published in London by Chapman and Hall in 1852.
 Knight, Frank  General-at-Sea The Life of Admiral Robert Blake  London Macdonald 1971

External links

 The Blake Museum, Bridgwater
 The Friends of Blake Museum, Bridgwater
 Admiral Blake – Article in Chambers's Edinburgh Journal, 29 May 1852
 Robert Blake, admiral and general at sea, William Hepworth Dixon, 1852

Military personnel from Somerset
English admirals
English generals
Lords Warden of the Cinque Ports
Alumni of Wadham College, Oxford
People from Bridgwater
Burials at Westminster Abbey
1598 births
1657 deaths
English merchants
Burials at St Margaret's, Westminster
17th-century merchants
17th-century Royal Navy personnel
Royal Navy personnel of the Anglo-Dutch Wars
English MPs 1640 (April)
English MPs 1653 (Barebones)
English MPs 1654–1655
English MPs 1656–1658
17th-century English businesspeople
Parliamentarian military personnel of the English Civil War
Lords of the Admiralty